Trans Air Congo (TAC) is an airline based at Pointe Noire Airport in Pointe-Noire, Republic of the Congo.

History
The company was established on 24 August 1994 by the El-Hage family and started services with a single Let 410 aircraft. Early services were largely between Brazzaville and Pointe Noire. In December 1994 an Antonov An-24 joined the fleet, followed in 1996 by a Boeing 727 and Yakovlev Yak-42D. Late 1997 saw the airline having to move temporarily to Johannesburg in South Africa to avoid a civil war.

Destinations
Trans Air Congo operates services to the following destinations:

Domestic scheduled destinations: Brazzaville and Pointe Noire.
International scheduled destinations: Cotonou, Douala, Libreville,  and Abidjan

Fleet

Current fleet
The Trans Air Congo fleet consists of the following aircraft (as of January 2021):

Former fleet
The airline previously operated the following aircraft:
 3 further Boeing 737-300
 1 McDonnell Douglas MD-82
 2 Embraer EMB 120 Brasilia
 1 Let L-410 Turbolet
 1 Antonov An-24

Certification
Trans Air Congo has been delivered the IOSA certificate until 2015.

MilesPlus
MilesPlus is the frequent flyer program developed by TAC. Registration is free and open to every passengers. First company in Congo to develop a fidelity program, MilesPlus has proved to be a successful tool as the program enrolled more than 2200 members since its creation in 2012. MilesPlus offers 4 different cards (Blue, Silver, Gold and Platinum).

Incidents and Accidents
 On 21 March 2011, a transport Antonov An-12 on a flight from Brazzaville Maya-Maya Airport to Pointe-Noire Antonio Agostinho Neto International Airport, registered TN-AGK, carrying a crew of 4, crashed into the Mvou-Mvou residential area in Pointe-Noire, Republic of the Congo. According to sources with the Congo National Agency of Civil Aviation, the aircraft had been cleared to land, and was on a 3-mile final approach when it crashed.  The Russian Embassy in Congo reported that the 3 Russian and 1 Kazakhstani crewmembers were killed in the crash.  Local medical services report that 23 bodies were recovered from the crash site, along with 15 injured people. Pre-accident pictures of TN-AGK can be seen at JetPhotos.net and Airliners.net.

References

External links

Official website

Airlines banned in the European Union
Airlines of the Republic of the Congo
Airlines established in 1994
1994 establishments in the Republic of the Congo